Joshua Levering (September 12, 1845 - October 6, 1935) was a prominent Baptist and a candidate for president of the United States in 1896. He was president of the trustees of The Southern Baptist Theological Seminary in Louisville, Kentucky, president of the Southern Baptist Convention, co-founder of the American Baptist Educational Society, and co-founder of the Layman's Missionary Movement.

Life

On September 12, 1845, Joshua Levering was born in Baltimore, Maryland to Eugene Levering and Ann S. Levering along with his identical twin brother Eugene Levering. In 1872, he married Martha W. Keyser and had seven children with her before her death in 1888 and later married her sister Margaret S. Keyser in 1892 until her death in 1895. In 1901, he married Helen Woods who would outlive him. From 1881 to 1903, he was the superintendent of the Sunday school of Eutaw Place Church.

In 1867, he served as a delegate to the Southern Baptist Convention. In 1884, he joined the Prohibition Party and was the party's candidate for comptroller in 1891 and governor in 1895. In 1887 and in 1893, he was chairman of the Maryland Prohibition party's state convention and served as a delegate to the 1888 and 1892 national conventions.

On July 1, 1892, he was narrowly defeated by James B. Cranfill for the Prohibition Party's vice presidential nomination with 416 delegates to 332 delegates after a story circulated that Levering was a member of the coffee industry. On May 29, 1896, Levering became the presidential candidate of the Prohibition Party by acclamation for the presidential election; he was a narrow gauger who supported a platform with one plank for prohibition unlike the broad gaugers who supported free silver and women's suffrage being added to the platform. He and his running mate Hale Johnson received 131,312 votes while the broad gauger presidential ticket of Charles Eugene Bentley and James H. Southgate received 13,968 votes.

In 1885, he was elected as the president of the local branch of the YMCA until his retirement on January 8, 1901. In 1903, 1904, 1906, and 1907, he and members of his family traveled throughout the world to observe missionaries in Japan and China. In 1925 he served as a delegate to the Southern Baptist Convention again. On October 6, 1935 he died in Baltimore at age 90.

See also
List of Southern Baptist Convention affiliated people
Southern Baptist Convention
Southern Baptist Convention Presidents
Temperance organizations

References

|-

Prohibition Party (United States) presidential nominees
Candidates in the 1896 United States presidential election
20th-century American politicians
1845 births
1935 deaths
Identical twin politicians
American twins
Politicians from Baltimore
Maryland Prohibitionists
Maryland Democrats
American temperance activists
Kentucky Prohibitionists
Southern Baptist Convention presidents
Baptists from Maryland